Giovanni Battista Repucci (1606 – February, 1688) was a Roman Catholic prelate who served as Bishop of Vico Equense (1657–1688).

Biography
Giovanni Battista Repucci was born in Chiusano di San Domenico, Italy in 1606. On 19 February 1657, he was appointed during the papacy of Pope Paul V as Bishop of Vico Equense. On 24 February 1657, he was consecrated bishop by Marcantonio Franciotti, Cardinal-Priest of Santa Maria della Pace. He served as Bishop of Vico Equense until his death in February 1688. His tomb has recently published for the first time by Gianpasquale Greco. The funerary portrait in marble has been referred to a local young sculptor, probably Lorenzo Vaccaro.

References

External links and additional sources
 (for Chronology of Bishops) 
 (for Chronology of Bishops)  

17th-century Italian Roman Catholic bishops
Bishops appointed by Pope Paul V
1606 births
1688 deaths